Fayette is a town in Sanpete County, Utah, United States. The population was 204 at the 2000 census.

History
Fayette was originally called "Warm Creek", and under the latter name was founded in 1861. A post office called Fayette was in operation between 1864 and 1966.  The present name is after Fayette, New York, the town where the LDS Church was founded.

Geography
According to the United States Census Bureau, the town has a total area of 0.5 square mile (1.2 km2), all land.

Demographics

As of the census of 2000, there were 204 people, 64 households, and 49 families residing in the town. The population density was 421.2 people per square mile (164.1/km2). There were 73 housing units at an average density of 150.7 per square mile (58.7/km2). The racial makeup of the town was 91.18% White, 2.45% Native American, 4.41% from other races, and 1.96% from two or more races. Hispanic or Latino of any race were 4.41% of the population.

There were 64 households, out of which 46.9% had children under the age of 18 living with them, 70.3% were married couples living together, 3.1% had a female householder with no husband present, and 21.9% were non-families. 21.9% of all households were made up of individuals, and 14.1% had someone living alone who was 65 years or older. The average household size was 3.19, and the average family size was 3.78.

In the town, the population was spread out, with 36.8% under 18, 10.3% from 18 to 24, 19.6% from 25 to 44, 20.1% from 45 to 64, and 13.2% who were 65 years of age or older. The median age was 30 years. For every 100 females, there were 98.1 males. For every 100 females aged 18 and over, there were 92.5 males.

The median income for a household in the town was $28,750, and the median income for a family was $36,500. Males had a median income of $28,750 versus $23,750 for females. The per capita income was $17,459. About 4.8% of families and 9.8% of the population were below the poverty line, including 9.7% of those under eighteen and none of those 65 or over.

See also
 
 List of cities and towns in Utah

References

External links

Towns in Sanpete County, Utah
Towns in Utah
Populated places established in 1861
1861 establishments in Utah Territory